The Lake Isabella State Forest is a state forest located in Lake County, Minnesota. The forest is located completely within the Superior National Forest and the Boundary Waters Canoe Area Wilderness, and is thus subject to the management of the United States Forest Service. At , it one of the smallest forests in the Minnesota state system.

Hiking, canoeing, and kayaking are popular outdoor recreational activities in the forest. Although there are no campsites within the forest itself, dispersed camping is possible in the neighboring Superior National Forest.

See also
List of Minnesota state forests

External links
Lake Isabella State Forest - Minnesota Department of Natural Resources (DNR)

References

Minnesota state forests
Protected areas of Lake County, Minnesota
Protected areas established in 1963
1963 establishments in Minnesota